Two Roads Diverge is a graphic novel written in conjunction with the film Southland Tales. It is Part One of the Southland Tales saga. The novel was written by Richard Kelly  - who also directed the film - and illustrated by Brett Weldele. The graphic novel was published by Graphitti Designs.

Southland Tales was initially planned to be a nine-part "interactive experience", with the first six parts published in six 100-page graphic novels that would be released in a six-month period up to the film's release in 2007. The feature film comprises the final three parts of the experience. A website was also developed to intertwine with the graphic novels and the film itself. The idea of six graphic novels was later narrowed down to three. The novels were written by Kelly and illustrated by Brett Weldele.

Plot
June 30, 2008:
Boxer Santaros (Dwayne Johnson) wakes up alone in the Nevada desert, he takes out a red syringe and injects himself in the neck. He begins walking through the desert.

Fortunio Balducci (Will Sasso) is on a houseboat with Tab Taverner-Former Mayor of Hermosa, his son Ronald Taverner (Seann William Scott) nephew, Jimmy Hermosa and friend, Krysta Now (Sarah Michelle Gellar). Fortunio is currently in an online-poker game with several American soldiers in Syria and loses, but the connection is lost because the soldiers were attacked – which means Fortunio is still going to lose his money anyway.

Fortunio owes some bookies in Las Vegas $100,000 so Tab suggests that Fortunio get out of Nevada before the holiday weekend begins; this should buy him some time. Fortunio can't get across the border because he has no interstate visa to get across and will take some time for him to get one.

Krysta Now tells Fortunio that she can get him a visa and to meet her at a bar called Buffalo Bill's situated at the border.

Fortunio leaves the boat and drives towards the border. On his way, he finds Boxer passed out on the road. He pulls over and approaches him. Boxer stirs and says:

‘I am a pragmatic prevaricator, with a propensity for oratorical seniority, which is too pleonastical to be expeditiously assimilated by any of your unequivocal veracities.’

Fortunio puts him inside the car and they begin to drive off again. Fortunio asks Boxer how and what he was doing out in the middle of the desert. Boxer doesn't know and asks the date. He seems to suffer from amnesia.

At the same time, a Nevada park ranger is tipped off about the whereabouts of an abandoned SUV with a burned-up dead body inside. The SUV is a prototype vehicle belonging to Treer which is powered by ‘Fluid Karma’. The vehicle and corpse is taken away to a facility nearby. The facility is broken into by armed-men, killing everyone inside and taking the SUV and corpse.

Fortunio asks Boxer can he remember anything. The only thing he seems to remember is a maze made of sand. Fortunio says that he is a big fan of Boxer's. Boxer is confused and doesn't know what he's talking about. Fortunio tells him that he is Boxer Santaros-a very famous action star and ex-pro-football player. He then tells him of the incidents that occurred on July 4, 2005.

The two make it to Buffalo Bill's where Krysta Now is performing on stage but instead of stripping, she begins to sing poetry. Fortunio explains the situation to Krysta, that he found Boxer lying in the desert, picked him up and that he has amnesia, so now he needs two visas.

Krysta will get the visas on one condition-play along a game she has created. Using Boxer's amnesia to her advantage, she will tell Boxer that the two of them were together in Vegas for the weekend, partying and working on a script that she wrote called ‘The Power’, she was researching a character at Buffalo Bill's (her character in the movie is an intelligent dancer interested in astrophysics). She then goes on to say that Fortunio has to pretend that he is a private detective and was hired to find Boxer and bring him to Krysta, if he doesn't do it, she will deliver him to the bookies in Vegas.

She ends up convincing the naive Boxer.

Apparently, the script (‘The Power’) was written solely by Krysta, and that Boxer never had anything to do with it to begin with, but she has convinced him that he is starring in and directing the film also.

He asks what it is about and who he plays. Krysta says that Boxer plays a renegade L.A.P.D. cop called Jericho Cane and that it revolves around the end of the world. She gives him a copy of the script to read.

Krysta begins talking to Fortunio outside her hotel room. She tells him to contact a lawyer and have him draw up a short form contract for himself for ‘The Power’ and to give himself $100,000 to settle his debt with the bookies.

While Boxer is reading the script, the phone begins to ring. He answers and the woman on the other end tells him:

‘is this the Pragmatic Prevaricator?-Stay with the girl, she is your only chance for survival, We saw the Shadows of the Morning Light, The Shadows of the Evening Sun, Until the Shadows and Light were One. Cross the Border At Dawn, Stay with the Girl, and whatever she says, Keep Taking the Injections, and whatever you do-do not board the rollercoaster.’

Krysta enters the room and asks about the script. Boxer says he likes it but there is lots of work to be done on it.

Later, Boxer signs the contract given to him by Fortunio and Krysta. He goes to get a check from the bank, he places his thumb on the scanner, which is fed back to US-IDent (who are looking for Boxer).

Boxer tells Krysta about the phone call and of his dream in the desert, she was in his dream and he remembers the song she sang in Buffalo Bill's in the dream also. She tells him that they have to ride the rollercoaster across the road from Buffalo Bill's. Boxer is hesitant at first but agrees. He takes an injection before they go on. Once they get to the top, Boxer has a vision...a vision of 1902, a Native-America tribe standing there. Boxer waves at one of them. He seems to have created a rupture in the fourth dimension. He goes back to 2008 all of a sudden and he tells Krysta about his vision. The two of them exit the rollercoaster together....

The book takes on a classical storyline and the title, "Two Roads Diverge" derives from Robert Frost's famous poem "The Road Not Taken". The cover also contains a quote from T. S. Eliot, stating that our world will not go out with a bang as we expect, but with a whimper.

External links
Publisher page

2006 books
American graphic novels
Comics based on films